Johnson Creek is a creek and tributary of the Trinity River watershed in Dallas County and Tarrant County, North Texas.

The creek may be named after Middleton Tate Johnson, who settled in the area in the early 1840s.

Course

The creek flows through the cities of Arlington and Grand Prairie and is generally completely bounded by development.  Notably it flows through the Six Flags Over Texas theme park and beside both Globe Life Field and Globe Life Park (a wide spot on the north side of the ballpark is named Mark Holtz Lake in memory of the former baseball announcer), while a tributary flows along the southern edge of The University of Texas at Arlington.

Ecology
In areas where development has not been substantial, native honeysuckle (Lonicera spp.), trumpet creeper (Campsis radicans), mustang grape (Vitis mustangensis), American Elm (Ulmus americana), hackberry (Celtis laevigata), oak (Quercus spp.), pecan (Carya illinoinensis), and eastern cottonwood (Populus deltoides) can be found growing along the riparian zone of the creek's banks.

See also
List of rivers of Texas

References
 
 

Rivers of Texas
Trinity River (Texas)
Rivers of Dallas County, Texas
Rivers of Tarrant County, Texas